The Government College of Engineering, Salem in Salem, Tamil Nadu, India, is an engineering education center in the state of Tamil Nadu. It is one of the three institutions offering Metallurgical Engineering as a full-time course in Tamil Nadu.

GCE-Salem was started during the Third Plan period in 1966 and is located on a beautiful site  surrounded by hills. This is the third government engineering institution formed in Tamil Nadu. The first batch of students was selected for 1966 for courses in Civil Engineering, Mechanical Engineering and Electrical Engineering. In 1973 the metallurgical engineering branch was started. The Electronics Engineering  and Communication Engineering branch was introduced in 1985. Computer science and engineering was started in 2001. All the undergraduate courses except Computer Science and Engineering are accredited by NBA.

Affiliations
The institute was affiliated to the University of Madras until 2001. After a brief affiliation with Periyar University, it was a constituent college of Anna University which is a statewide centralized engineering university.  From the year of 2009, GCE Salem has been promoted as one of the Autonomous Engineering Colleges in Tamil Nadu.

The college is a Regional Centre for Anna University for Ph.D. and M.S., programmes. It is the zonal office for the conduct of Anna University Examinations in the 21 colleges belonging to this zone. The institution is one of the eleven technical institutions of Tamil Nadu selected for World Bank financial assistance under Technical Education Quality Improvement Programme (TEQIP). The institution has received an approval for a sum of Rs. 10.967 crores as lifetime allocation for the project implementation spread over a period of four years from 2003 to 2007.

Buildings
The Administrative block or Main block is the capital of the College. The streams of Engineering have dedicated buildings. All the Engineering departments are equipped with technologies aided by funding from World Bank through Technical Education Quality Improvement Program (TEQIP). In TEQIP Phase II ( from 2011-2014), the institution has received Rs.12 crore for enhancing research activities.

Admission
Admission to the institute is through single window counselling system of Anna University. Undergraduate students are selected based on competitive student rankings in higher secondary examination and then subjected to counselling.

Postgraduate students are selected based on competitive rankings in Tamil Nadu Common Entrance Test (TANCET) and few seats through GATE Examinations.

Academic and departments

 Administrative Block
 Civil Engineering
 Mechanical Engineering
 Electronics and Communication Engineering
 Electrical and Electronics Engineering
 Computer Science and Engineering
 Metallurgical Engineering
 Physics department
 Chemistry
 Mathematics
 English
 Physical Education
 Library
 Digital Library

Master courses
 Structural Engineering
 CAD
 Thermal Engineering
 Power Electronics and Drives
 Welding Technology

Planetarium
The Planetarium of Government College of Engineering, Salem-11. was commissioned on 6 February 1979 by Dr. M.G.Ramachandran the then Chief Minister of Tamil Nadu. The sky is projected on the dome of the Planetarium.

See also
 List of Tamil Nadu Government's Educational Institutions
 List of Tamil Nadu Government's Engineering Colleges

References

External links
GCE Salem home page 

Engineering colleges in Tamil Nadu
Education in Salem, Tamil Nadu
Academic institutions formerly affiliated with the University of Madras
1966 establishments in Madras State
Educational institutions established in 1966